Reza Vali (born 1952 in Ghazvin) is an Iranian musician and composer.

Reza Vali was born in Iran and studied at the Tehran Conservatory.  In 1972, he attended the University of Music and Performing Arts, Vienna, where he studied composition.  He later attended the University of Pittsburgh where he received his PhD in composition and theory.  Since 1988 he has been on the faculty at Carnegie Mellon University.

He received the honor prize of the Austrian Ministry of Arts and Sciences and two Andrew W. Mellon Fellowships.  He also received commissions from the Pittsburgh Symphony Orchestra, the Boston Modern Orchestra Project, the Pittsburgh New Music Ensemble, Kronos Quartet, the Seattle Chamber Players, and the Arizona Friends of Chamber Music, as well as grants from the Pennsylvania Council on the Arts and the Pittsburgh Board of Public Education. He was selected by the Pittsburgh Cultural Trust as the Outstanding Emerging Artist for which he received the Creative Achievement Award. Vali's orchestral works have been performed in the United States by the Pittsburgh Symphony, the Seattle Symphony, the Boston Modern Orchestra Project, the Baltimore Symphony, the Memphis Symphony Orchestra, and Orchestra 2001. His chamber music has been performed by the Cuarteto Latinoamericano, the Del Sol Quartet, the Pittsburgh New Music Ensemble, Kronos Quartet, the Seattle Chamber Players, and the Da Capo Chamber Players.

Recordings
 2019: Longing: Chamber Music of Reza Vali (MSR Classics)
 2018: The Ancient Call (Albany Records)
 2015: The Book of Calligraphy (Albany Records)
 2013: Reza Vali: Towards that Endless Plain (BMOP)
 2006: Chant and Dance: Works for Chamber Ensemble (Albany Records)
 2005: Calligraphies: Works for String Quartet (Albany Records)
 1995: Persian Folklore (New Albion)

See also
Persian Symphonic Music

References

External links
Reza Vali personal website
Arghonoon Project presented at the Studio for Creative Inquiry at Carnegie Mellon University

1952 births
Carnegie Mellon University faculty
Iranian classical composers
Iranian emigrants to the United States
Living people
People from Qazvin
Persian classical musicians
University of Music and Performing Arts Vienna alumni
University of Pittsburgh alumni